Vilyuchik, also known as Vilyuchinsky is a stratovolcano in the southern part of the Kamchatka Peninsula, Russia. It is located about  SSW of the closed city of Vilyuchinsk.

See also
 List of volcanoes in Russia
 List of ultras of Northeast Asia

References

Sources
 
 

Mountains of the Kamchatka Peninsula
Volcanoes of the Kamchatka Peninsula
Stratovolcanoes of Russia
Holocene stratovolcanoes
Holocene Asia
Pleistocene stratovolcanoes